Agrobom, Saldonha e Vale Pereiro is a civil parish in the municipality of Alfândega da Fé, Portugal. It was formed in 2013 by the merger of the former parishes Agrobom, Saldonha and Vale Pereiro. The population in 2011 was 265, in an area of 32.60 km².

References

Freguesias of Alfândega da Fé